Olenekoceras is an ammonoid cephalopod from the Lower Triassic included in the ceratitid family Sibiritidae, once included in the Noritaceae but now in the Ceratitaceae.

Distribution
Japan and the Russian Federation.

References
Notes

Bibliography
 W.J. Arkell, et al., 1957. Mesozoic Ammonoidea; Treatise on Invertebrate Paleontology, Part L. Geological Society of America and University of Kansas Press.

Triassic ammonites
Fossils of Russia
Olenekian life
Ceratitida genera
Ceratitoidea